Crossley Hospital West, founded in 1905 as the Liverpool Sanatorium, was a tuberculosis sanatorium situated on the outer edge of Delamere Forest in Cheshire. It closed in the 1960s and has since been demolished.

History
The facility was largely financed by Lady Willox and Sir William Hartley and opened as the Liverpool Sanatorium in 1901. Admission was restricted to residents of Liverpool. It joined the National Health Service as Crossley Hospital West in 1948 and closed in the 1960s. It was subsequently used as a private nursing home before being demolished.

See also

Listed buildings in Manley, Cheshire

References

Hospital buildings completed in 1901
Hospitals in Cheshire
Tuberculosis sanatoria in the United Kingdom